Kennett is a city in and the county seat of Dunklin County, Missouri, United States. It has a population of 10,932 according to the 2010 Census. Kennett is the largest city in the Bootheel, a mostly agricultural area.

History
Settlers built log cabins in the area in the first half of the 19th century, naming their settlement Chilletecaux in honor of a Delaware Indian chief who lived there. The town was renamed Butler in the late 1840s. Due to mail delivery problems because of other jurisdictions named the same, the settlement was renamed as Kennett, in honor of the mayor of the city of St. Louis, Luther M. Kennett.

In the 1890s, a railroad reached the area, stimulating growth in the town. In that same period, the state began construction of a massive drainage program in the St. Francis River basin, which was floodplain and wetlands.  In the 20th century, after timber clearing, the area was developed for cultivation of cotton and other commodity crops.

Geography and climate
Kennett is located at  (36.2403403, -90.0480886).

As part of the southern extremity of Missouri, Kennett has a humid subtropical climate (Köppen climate classification Cfa) with cool winters and hot, humid summers, ample precipitation through much of the year, and is part of USDA Plant Hardiness Zone 7.

Demographics

The Kennett Micropolitan Statistical Area consists of Dunklin County.

As of 2000 the median household income was $26,088 and the median family income was $34,167. Males had a median income of $29,958 versus $18,770 for females. The per capita income for the city was $14,397. Living below the poverty line were 26.1% of the population and 20.5% of families. Those living below the poverty line were 37.5% of those under the age of 18 and 24.0% of those 65 and older.

2010 census
As of the census of 2010, there were 10,932 people, 4,377 households, and 2,849 families residing in the city. The racial makeup of the city was 80.1% White, 16.2% African American, 0.2% Native American, 0.6% Asian, 0.1% Pacific Islander, 1.3% from other races, and 1.7% from two or more races. Hispanic or Latino of any race were 3.5% of the population.

There were 4,377 households, of which 32.6% had children under the age of 18 living with them, 42.5% were married couples living together, 18.1% had a female householder with no husband present, 4.5% had a male householder with no wife present, and 34.9% were non-families. 30.2% of all households were made up of individuals, and 12.4% had someone living alone who was 65 years of age or older. The average household size was 2.41 and the average family size was 2.95.

The median age in the city was 38.4 years. 25.5% of residents were under the age of 18; 8.8% were between the ages of 18 and 24; 23.7% were from 25 to 44; 25.5% were from 45 to 64; and 16.5% were 65 years of age or older. The gender makeup of the city was 47.1% male and 52.9% female.

Government
Kennett is located in Missouri's 8th congressional district in southeastern Missouri and is the county seat of Dunklin County, Missouri.

The city of Kennett is governed by a city council with 10 elected city council members with the mayor acting as the presiding officer.

Education
Kennett has six public schools operated by the Kennett School District 39. The pre-school is called Kennett Early Learning Center. The elementary schools are South Elementary School and H. Byron Masterson Elementary School. The other schools are Kennett Middle School, Kennett High School, and Kennett Career and Technical Center. Kennett High School's baseball team won the class 4 state championship in 2021.

Kennett Christian Academy is a co-ed, private school affiliated with the First United Pentecostal Church that opened in 1979 and offers elementary through high school classes.

Kennett is home to two higher education branch institutions. Southeast Missouri State University at Kennett is a branch of the Cape Girardeau main campus and Three Rivers College (Missouri) is a branch of the Poplar Bluff main campus.

Kennett has a public library, the Dunklin County Library.

Media
The Delta Dunklin Democrat serves as the area's local newspaper.

Transportation
Kennett Memorial Airport is a city-owned, public-use airport located one nautical mile (1.85 km) southeast of the central business district of Kennett.

Notable people

References

External links
 
 City of Kennett official website
 Kennett Chamber of Commerce
 Historic maps of Kennett in the Sanborn Maps of Missouri Collection at the University of Missouri

Cities in Dunklin County, Missouri
County seats in Missouri
Cities in Missouri